L'Estère is a commune in the Gonaïves Arrondissement, in the Artibonite department of Haiti.
It has 3,000 inhabitants. This historical city of 3,000 inhabitants is where the famous battle of the Haitian Revolution took place on February 23, 1803 between the troops of Rochambeau and Dessalines at the Ravine-à-Couleuvres.

References

Populated places in Artibonite (department)
Communes of Haiti